The 1921 Shaw Bears football team was an American football team that represented Shaw University as a member of the Colored Intercollegiate Athletic Association (CIAA) during the 1921 college football season. The team was led by first-year head coach Henry B. Hucles.

Schedule

References

Shaw
Shaw Bears football seasons
Shaw Bears football